The 2022 Big East Conference softball tournament will be held at Cacciatore Stadium on the campus of the DePaul University in Rosemont, Illinois. The tournament will run May 12 through May 14, 2022 and will determine the champion for the Big East Conference for the 2022 NCAA Division I softball season.  The tournament champion will earn the Big East Conference's automatic bid to the 2022 NCAA Division I softball tournament. The semifinals and finals will be broadcast on Fox Sports 2.

Format and seeding
The top four teams from the conference's round-robin regular season will qualify for the tournament, and will be seeded one through four.  They will play a double-elimination tournament.

Tournament

Game results

References

Big East Tournament
Big East Conference softball tournament
Big East Conference softball tournament